Napoléon-Louis Bonaparte (11 October 1804 – 17 March 1831) was King of Holland for less than two weeks in July 1810 as Louis II. He was a son of Louis Bonaparte (King Louis I) and Queen Hortense. His father was the younger brother of Napoleon I of France who ruled the Napoleonic Kingdom of Holland from 1806 to 1810. His mother was the daughter of Josephine de Beauharnais, Napoleon's first wife. His younger brother, Louis-Napoléon, became Emperor of the French in 1852 as Napoleon III.

Biography
Napoléon Louis's brother, Napoléon Charles, died in 1807 at the age of four. On his death, Napoléon Louis became Prince Royal of Holland. It also made Napoléon Louis the second eldest nephew of Emperor Napoléon I, who at the time had no legitimate children, and he was his uncle's likely eventual successor. He lost this presumptive status on 20 March 1811 when his uncle's second wife, Marie Louise, gave birth to a son, Napoléon François Joseph Charles Bonaparte, who was styled the King of Rome and later the Duke of Reichstadt.

In 1809, Napoléon I appointed him as Grand Duke of Berg, a status he kept until 1813.

On 1 July 1810, Louis I of Holland abdicated his throne in favour of Napoléon Louis. For the nine days between his father's abdication and the fall of Holland to the invading French army in July 1810, Napoléon Louis reigned as Lodewijk II, King of Holland.

When Napoléon I was deposed in 1815 after the Battle of Waterloo, the House of Bourbon was restored to the throne of France. Napoléon Louis fled into exile, but the Bonapartes never abandoned the thought of restoring the Napoleonic Empire.

On 23 July 1826 Napoléon Louis married his first cousin, Charlotte, who was the daughter of Joseph Bonaparte, eldest brother of Napoléon I. He and his younger brother Louis-Napoléon Bonaparte settled in Italy, where they espoused liberal politics and became involved with the Carbonari, an organization fighting Austria's domination of northern Italy.

On 17 March 1831, while fleeing Italy due to a crackdown on revolutionary activity by Papal and Austrian troops, Napoléon Louis, suffering from measles, died in Forlì. Eventually, the Napoleonic Empire was restored by Napoléon Louis's younger brother, Charles-Louis, who became Napoléon III in 1852.

Napoléon Louis is buried at Saint-Leu-La-Foret, Île-de-France.

Gallery

References

Napoleon Louis Bonaparte
Napoleon Louis Bonaparte
Napoleon Louis Bonaparte
Grand Dukes of Berg and Cleves
People of the Kingdom of Holland
1804 births
1831 deaths